Orrin Wiley Locke (April 24, 1859 in Coventry, Vermont – January 1, 1951) was a Republican member of the Vermont State Senate, who represented the Orleans Vermont Senate District.

Orrin Locke was first elected to the Vermont State Senate in 1922.

Biography
Locke was born in Coventry, Vermont on April 24, 1859.

Public life
Locke was first elected to the Vermont House of Representatives in 1912.

He was elected to the Vermont Senate in 1922.

Footnotes

Vermont state senators
1859 births
1951 deaths
People from Barton, Vermont